Dico may refer to:
 Dico, a village the Lerik Rayon of Azerbaijan
 Dico's, a fast food chain in China
 Diritti e doveri delle persone stabilmente conviventi (DiCo), a proposed Italian bill for cohabiting couples
People
 Brandon DiCamillo (b. 1976), an American comedian/actor
 Pelé (b. 1940), nickname for Brazilian footballer